The Forest Landscape Integrity Index (FLII) is an annual global index of forest condition measured by degree of anthropogenic modification. Created by a team of 48 scientists, the FLII, in its measurement of 300m pixels of forest across the globe, finds that ~17.4 million km2 of forest has high landscape-level integrity (with a score from 9.6–10), compared to ~14.6 million with medium integrity (6–9.6) and ~12.2 million km2 with low integrity (0–6).

The FLII finds that most remaining high-integrity forest landscapes are found in Canada, Russia, Rocky Mountains, Alaska, the Amazon, the Guianas, southern Chile, Central Africa, and New Guinea. Low integrity forests, on the other hand, are found in Western and Central Europe, the American Southwest, South-East Asia west of New Guinea, the Andes, much of China and India, the Albertine Rift, West Africa, Mesoamerica, and the Atlantic Forests of Brazil.

The results are meant to help decision-makers at all levels achieve their commitments to the Sustainable Development Goals (SDGs), United Nations Convention on Biological Diversity (CBD), Convention to Combat Desertification (UNCCD), and the Framework Convention on Climate Change (UNFCCC).

Forest Integrity
An ecosystem is considered to have integrity when its structure, composition, and ecological processes are within their natural range.

Country rankings
172 countries have been ranked:

Background
The index was authored by a global team of forest conservation experts, including:

See also
 Intact forest landscape
 List of countries by forest area

References

External links 
 Official site & map

Biodiversity
Sustainable forest management
Environmental terminology
Forest conservation
Environmental indices